Strangers is an upcoming British fantasy drama film directed by Andrew Haigh. Starring Andrew Scott, Paul Mescal, Claire Foy, and Jamie Bell, it is a loose adaptation of the 1987 novel Strangers by Taichi Yamada. Haigh wrote the screenplay. It is the second film adaptation of the novel, after the 1988 Japanese film The Discarnates directed by Nobuhiko Obayashi.

Premise
Adam, a screenwriter living in London, encounters his mysterious neighbour Harry and then discovers in his childhood home his long-dead parents looking the same as they did 30 years ago.

Cast
 Andrew Scott as Adam
 Paul Mescal as Harry
 Claire Foy as Adam's mother
 Jamie Bell as Adam's father

Production
Filming began in the United Kingdom before by the film and the principal cast were announced on 30 June 2022. The announcement attracted inquiries on social media as to whether the plot involves a romance between Scott and Mescal's characters. The Daily Beast found this likely since Mescal's character corresponds to a woman character in the original novel who has a romance with the protagonist, and since Haigh has previously directed gay-themed works.

References

External links
 

Upcoming films
Upcoming English-language films
British fantasy drama films
Films directed by Andrew Haigh
Films set in London
Films shot in London
Films based on Japanese novels
Film4 Productions films
Searchlight Pictures films